is a Japanese politician of the Liberal Democratic Party, a member of the House of Representatives in the Diet (national legislature). A native of Nagoya, Aichi and graduate of Waseda University, he was elected to the first of his two terms in the Aichi Prefectural Assembly in 1999 and then to the House of Representatives for the first time in 2005.

See also 
 Koizumi Children

References

External links 
  in Japanese.

1964 births
Living people
People from Nagoya
Waseda University alumni
Koizumi Children
Members of the House of Representatives from Aichi Prefecture
Members of the Aichi Prefectural Assembly
Liberal Democratic Party (Japan) politicians